Burnt Hill is a mountain in Sullivan County, New York, west of Grooville. Morton Hill is to its northwest, Rattle Hill to its east-northeast, and Gray Hill to its southeast.

References

Mountains of Sullivan County, New York
Mountains of New York (state)